Irina-Camelia Begu defeated Lucia Bronzetti in the final, 6–2, 6–2 to win the singles tennis title at the 2022 Internazionali Femminili di Palermo. It was her first title since 2017.

Danielle Collins was the reigning champion, but did not participate.

Seeds

Draw

Finals

Top half

Bottom half

Qualifying

Seeds

Qualifiers

Lucky losers

Qualifying draw

First qualifier

Second qualifier

Third qualifier

Fourth qualifier

Fifth qualifier

Sixth qualifier

References 

2022 WTA Tour
2022 Internazionali Femminili di Palermo - 1